WQFL (100.9 FM) is a radio station broadcasting a Christian Worship format as an affiliate of Air1. Licensed to Rockford, Illinois, the station is currently owned by Educational Media Foundation.

History
The station began broadcasting May 2, 1974, and was owned by Open Bible Church. In 1979, the station was sold to Rockford First Assembly of God, which operated it through its subsidiary Quest For Life, Inc. The station would later air a Christian Contemporary format as "Positive Hit Radio 101QFL". In 2009, the station was sold to Educational Media Foundation, along with 91.1 WGSL, for $2 million.

References

External links

Air1 radio stations
Contemporary Christian radio stations in the United States
Radio stations established in 1974
1974 establishments in Illinois
Educational Media Foundation radio stations
QFL